Micropterix algeriella is a species of moth belonging to the family Micropterigidae. It was described by Émile Louis Ragonot in 1889 and is endemic to Algeria.

References

Micropterigidae
Moths described in 1889
Endemic fauna of Algeria
Moths of Africa
Taxa named by Émile Louis Ragonot